Hugh F. Campbell (1846 – March 1, 1881) was an Irish professional baseball player who pitched in just one season.  He was a starting pitcher for the  Elizabeth Resolutes of the National Association.  His younger brother, Mike Campbell, was the team's starting first baseman.
   
He pitched much better than his 2–16 record would indicate.  The Resolutes won 2, lost 21, and made 247 errors, an average of 10.7 per game, with Campbell himself making 21 of them.  As a result, he gave up 213 runs in 165 innings pitched, but only 52 of them were earned runs.  His ERA was 2.95, which was better than the league average, and was in fact sixth-best in the league.  His two victories came against the Brooklyn Atlantics and the Boston Red Stockings.

Campbell died at the age of 34 in Newark, New Jersey of phthisis pulmonalis, and is interred at Holy Sepulchre Cemetery in East Orange, New Jersey.

See also
List of players from Ireland in Major League Baseball

References

External links

Major League Baseball pitchers
New Jersey Irvingtons players
Elizabeth Resolutes players
Major League Baseball players from Ireland
Irish baseball players
19th-century baseball players
1846 births
1881 deaths
Burials at Holy Sepulchre Cemetery (East Orange, New Jersey)
19th-century deaths from tuberculosis
Tuberculosis deaths in New Jersey
Irish emigrants to the United States (before 1923)